The List is Rosanne Cash's twelfth studio album, released on Manhattan Records on October 6, 2009, her only album for the label. 

The album is based on a list of 100 greatest country and American songs that father Johnny Cash gave her when she was 18, to expand her knowledge of country music. The album featured covers of classic songs, and was dedicated to her father Johnny Cash. It also includes guest performances by Bruce Springsteen, Elvis Costello, Jeff Tweedy and Rufus Wainwright.

The album also contained covers of classic country songs made by Jimmie Rodgers, The Carter Family, Don Gibson, Ray Price, Lefty Frizzell, Patsy Cline, and other country stars, as well the traditional folk song "Motherless Children" and 1960s folk numbers by Bob Dylan and Peter, Paul, and Mary. Three songs had previously been recorded by her father: "Sea of Heartbreak", "The Long Black Veil," which he had recorded and performed numerous times and "Girl from the North Country", a 1963 Bob Dylan song that was re-recorded as a duet between Dylan and Cash in 1969 for Dylan's Nashville Skyline album.

The List peaked at #5 on Billboards country album chart — Cash's first top ten album on the chart in 22 years — and hit #22 on the general Billboard Hot 200, topping her previously most successful album on that chart, 1981's Seven Year Ache which peaked at #26.  It was also her first entry on the Billboard Top Rock Albums chart, where it debuted and peaked at #8. The album was nominated for a Grammy Award for Best Americana Album and won the prestigious Album of the Year award at the 2010 Americana Music Honors & Awards.

Track listing

Personnel
Rosanne Cash – vocals
Bruce Springsteen – vocals
Jeff Tweedy – vocals
Rufus Wainwright – vocals
Elvis Costello – vocals
Joe Bonadio – drums
Zev Katz – bass
John Leventhal – organ, bass, dobro, guitar, harmonica, mandolin, percussion, drums, harmonium, Wurlitzer
Tim Luntzel – bass
Shawn Pelton – drums
Curtis King – background vocals
Rick DePofi – piano, bass clarinet, hornProduction notes:'
John Leventhal – producer, engineer, mixing
Rick DePofi – co-producer, engineer, mixing
Ted Jensen – mastering
Deborah Feingold – photography
Perry Greenfield – product manager
Jill Dell'Abate – production coordination

Charts

Weekly charts

Year-end charts

References

2009 albums
Rosanne Cash albums
Albums produced by John Leventhal